John de Burgh (1286 – 18 June 1313) was an Irish noble who was the son of Richard Óg de Burgh, 2nd Earl of Ulster and his wife, Margarite.

Heir apparent to the Earldom of Ulster, he married (as her first husband) in Waltham Abbey, Essex, on 30 September 1308, Elizabeth de Clare, sister of Gilbert de Clare, 7th Earl of Hertford and 8th Earl of Gloucester. She was the founder of Clare College, Cambridge, and a granddaughter of King Edward I of England. Gloucester in turn married John's sister Maud.

John and Elizabeth had one son:
William Donn de Burgh, 3rd Earl of Ulster (1312–1333)

However, John died in Galway the next year, leaving his infant son William heir to the Earldom.

Ancestry

References

1286 births
1313 deaths
13th-century Irish people
14th-century Irish people
People from County Galway
John de
Normans in Ireland
Younger sons of earls